TLYA may refer to:
 23S rRNA (cytidine1920-2'-O)-methyltransferase
 16S rRNA (cytidine1409-2'-O)-methyltransferase